Ronald Wayne Snell (born August 11, 1948) is a Canadian retired ice hockey player. He was drafted by the Pittsburgh Penguins in the second round, fourteenth overall, in the 1968 NHL Amateur Draft. He played seven games in the NHL, all for the Pittsburgh Penguins, during the 68-69 and 69-70 seasons.  He then jumped to the World Hockey Association, playing two seasons for the Winnipeg Jets 73-74 and 74-75.  In 90 games over those two seasons Ron had 24 goals and 25 assists, along with 40 penalty minutes.

External links

1948 births
Living people
Baltimore Clippers players
Buffalo Norsemen players
Hershey Bears players
Sportspeople from Regina, Saskatchewan
Pittsburgh Penguins draft picks
Pittsburgh Penguins players
Rochester Americans players
Winnipeg Jets (WHA) players
Ice hockey people from Saskatchewan
Canadian ice hockey right wingers